Shepherding a Child's Heart is a 1995 book by American pastor Tedd Tripp about parenting, with a particular focus on advantages of discipline, including spanking.

The book has been described as one of the most popular Christian parenting books and a required reading at many Christian parenting courses. Due to its recommendations of spanking as a God-endorsed parental technique, the book has raised some controversy in the United States and abroad, for example for promoting spanking as a useful technique even for infants under one year.

Reception and controversy 
The book has been described as one of the most popular Christian parenting books and a required reading at many Christian parenting courses.

In 2008 in Seattle a speech by the book author has caused local protests.

The small publishing house  affiliated with the Baptist Union of Poland which is responsible for the Polish translation declared that it is immediately if temporarily halting the sales of the book pending further analysis, and it is considering withdrawing the book from the Polish market. A week later the book was withdrawn from the market.

See also
Child corporal punishment laws
Corporal punishment in the home

References

External links

1995 non-fiction books
Parenting advice books
Christian literature
Spanking